Cupido may refer to:

Biology
 Cupido (butterfly), a genus of butterflies
 Biotodoma cupido, a species of cichlid
 Tympanuchus cupido, the North American greater prairie chicken

Music
 Cupido (group), a Spanish band that released the 2019 song "Autoestima"
 Cupido, a 2023 studio album by Tini
 "Cupido", the title track and tenth single of the parent album by Tini
 "Cupido" (song), a 2012 song by Ivy Queen
 "Cupido", a 1988 song by El Gran Combo de Puerto Rico from Romántico y Sabroso

Places
 Cupido, Suriname, an indigenous village near Wageningen
 Cúpido Formation a geologic formation in Mexico
 Cupido River, Espírito Santo, Brazil

People 
 Aidynn Cupido (born 1996), South African rugby union player
 Damian Cupido (born 1982), Australian rules footballer
 Joey Cupido (born 1990), Canadian lacrosse player
 John Cupido (born 1976), South African politician
 Keanu Cupido (born 1998), South African footballer
 Luca Cupido (born 1995), Italian-born American Olympic water polo player
 Paul Cupido (born 1972), Dutch fine art photographer

Other uses 
 Cupid, or Cupīdō, the Roman god of love
 Cupido, a character in the Battle Arena Toshinden fighting game series
 763 Cupido, an asteroid

See also
 Cupid (disambiguation)
 Cupidon (disambiguation)